Ladislav Jurkemik (born 20 July 1953) is a former Slovak football player and later a football manager. He played in the Czechoslovak First League for Inter Bratislava and Dukla Banská Bystrica. Jurkemik played internationally for Czechoslovakia; he played a total of 57 matches and scored 3 goals. He managed Slovakia in 2002 and 2003.

Playing career
Jurkemik played in his domestic Czechoslovak First League from 1973 to 1984, with two periods at Inter Bratislava interrupted by the 1980–81 season, which he spent at Dukla Banská Bystrica. He subsequently went to the Swiss league, where he played for FC St. Gallen.

Jurkemik was involved in three major tournaments as a player of Czechoslovakia. He was a participant in the 1976 UEFA European Championship, where Czechoslovakia won the gold medal, in the 1980 UEFA European Championship, where Czechoslovakia won the bronze medal, and at the 1982 FIFA World Cup. He also played one match for the Olympic team in 1975.

Management career
After his playing career Jurkemik became a manager, taking charge of various club sides as well as the Slovakia national football team. In 2008 he took charge of 1. FC Slovácko in the Czech Second League, his first appointment in the Czech Republic. He was relieved of his duties in December 2008 with the club 14th in the league and just two points above the relegation zone. Jurkemik managed FC Nitra but became the second departing manager of the 2012–13 Slovak First Football League after an eight-game winless streak left Nitra bottom of the league after 15 matches in November 2012.

Honours

Player
Czechoslovakia
UEFA Euro 1976: Winner
UEFA Euro 1980: Third place
1982 FIFA World Cup: Group stage

References

External links
 

1953 births
Living people
Czechoslovak footballers
Slovak footballers
UEFA Euro 1976 players
UEFA Euro 1980 players
1982 FIFA World Cup players
UEFA European Championship-winning players
Czechoslovakia international footballers
FK Inter Bratislava players
FC St. Gallen players
Czechoslovak expatriate footballers
Expatriate footballers in Austria
Expatriate football managers in Austria
Expatriate footballers in Switzerland
Czechoslovak expatriate sportspeople in Austria
Czechoslovak expatriate sportspeople in Switzerland
Slovak expatriate footballers
Slovak expatriate sportspeople in Austria
Expatriate football managers in the Czech Republic
Slovak expatriate sportspeople in the Czech Republic
Czechoslovak football managers
Slovak football managers
Slovak Super Liga managers
SK Sturm Graz managers
FC Spartak Trnava managers
Kapfenberger SV managers
MŠK Rimavská Sobota managers
FC Senec managers
MFK Ružomberok managers
MŠK Žilina managers
Slovakia national football team managers
Slovakia national under-21 football team managers
FK Inter Bratislava managers
1. FC Slovácko managers
FC Nitra managers
Association football defenders
FK Dukla Banská Bystrica players
People from Topoľčany District
Sportspeople from the Nitra Region
FC Chur 97 players
FC Chur 97 managers